Francesch is a surname. Notable people with this surname include:

 Homero Francesch (born 1947), Uruguay-born Swiss pianist
 José Francesch (1908–1964), Spanish swimmer
 Raffaele Francesch (born 1960), Italian swimmer

See also
 Francesca
 Franceschi